Thomas Jasper "Tom" Cat Sr. is a fictional character and one of the two titular main protagonists (the other being Jerry Mouse) in Metro-Goldwyn-Mayer's series of Tom and Jerry theatrical animated short films. Created by William Hanna and Joseph Barbera, he is a grey and white anthropomorphic domestic short haired mute tuxedo cat who first appeared in the 1940 MGM animated short Puss Gets the Boot. The cat was known as "Jasper" during his debut in the short; however, beginning with his next appearance in The Midnight Snack he was known as "Tom" or "Thomas".

History

Tom and Jerry cartoons
His name, "Tom Cat", is based on "tomcat", a word which refers to male cats. He is usually mute and rarely heard speaking with the exception of a few cartoons (such as 1943's The Lonesome Mouse, 1944's The Zoot Cat, 1947's Part Time Pal, 1953's Puppy Tale and 1992's Tom and Jerry: The Movie). His only notable vocal sounds outside of this are his various screams whenever he is subjected to panic or, more frequently, pain. He is continuously after Jerry Mouse, for whom he sets traps, many of which backfire and cause damage to him rather than Jerry. His trademark scream (which, ironically, was originally done by Butch in Springtime for Thomas) was provided by creator William Hanna, Hanna's recordings of Tom screaming are later used as a stock sound effect for the other MGM Cartoon characters, whenever they scream including majority of Tex Avery's shorts.

Tom has changed over the years upon his evolution, especially after the first episodes. For example, in his debut, he was quadrupedal. However, over the years (since the episode Dog Trouble), he has become almost completely bipedal and has human intelligence and he is similar to his previous appearance, in 1945 shorts he had twisted whiskers and his appearance kept changing. In the 1940s and early 1950s, he had white fur between his eyes. In newer cartoons, the white fur is gone. As a slapstick cartoon character, Tom has a superhuman level of elasticity.

Tom is usually defeated (or very rarely, killed, like in Mouse Trouble, where he explodes) in the end, although there are some stories where he outwits and defeats Jerry. Though besides Jerry he also has trouble with many other mouse characters or cat characters. One of them that appears frequently is Spike Bulldog. Spike regularly appears and usually assists Jerry and beats up Tom. Though in some occasions Tom beats him or he turns on Jerry (like his debut appearance in Dog Trouble). Usually when Tom is chasing Jerry after a bit Jerry turns the tables on Tom and beats him or uses an outside character such as Spike to beat Tom.

Tom has variously been portrayed as a house cat doing his job, and a victim of Jerry's blackmail attempts, sometimes within the same short. He is almost always called by his full name "Thomas" by Mammy Two Shoes. In 1961 short Switchin' Kitten Tom has a membership card as belong to the "International Brotherhood of Cats"

Anchors Aweigh and Dangerous When Wet
Tom and Jerry showed up together at the 1945 Technicolor Metro-Goldwyn-Mayer musical Anchors Aweigh where Tom briefly appears as a butler for King Jerry, the latter who has a dance sequence with Gene Kelly, and also in another musical with the same studio Dangerous When Wet (1953), where, in a dream sequence, main character Katie Higgins (Esther Williams) does an underwater ballet with Tom and Jerry, as well as animated depictions of the different people in her life.

Voice actors
Despite almost every short depicting Tom as silent (besides his vocal sounds such as screaming and gasping), there are some cartoons which feature him speaking, with his first film appearance (along with co-star Jerry) in 1992, Tom and Jerry: The Movie, being an example as Tom and Jerry talk throughout the film.

Here are several of his voiceover actors:
 Harry E. Lang (1940–1953): Vocal effects in the Hanna-Barbera era (1940–1953) shorts, and speaking in the shorts: The Lonesome Mouse, Quiet Please!, The Mouse Comes To Dinner (1943–1946)
 William Hanna (1941–1958, 2006, 2014–present): Vocal effects in the Hanna-Barbera era (1940–1958) shorts, Tom and Jerry: Shiver Me Whiskers (archival recordings from classic shorts), Tom and Jerry Tales (archival recordings from classic shorts, several Season 1 episodes only), The Tom and Jerry Show (archival recordings from classic shorts), Tom & Jerry (archival recordings from classic shorts), Tom and Jerry Special Shorts (archival recordings from classic shorts) and Tom and Jerry in New York (archival recordings from classic shorts), MultiVersus (archival recordings from classic shorts), speaking in the shorts: Trap Happy, Cruise Cat, His Mouse Friday
 Kent Rogers (1942): Vocal effects in the 1942 shorts: Fraidy Cat and Puss n' Toots
 Jerry Mann (1944, 1946, 1950): Vocal effects and speaking in the 1944 shorts: The Zoot Cat and The Million Dollar Cat, speaking in the 1946 short: Solid Serenade (archival recordings from The Zoot Cat), speaking in the 1950 short: The Framed Cat
 Billy Bletcher (1944, 1946): speaking in the 1944 short: The Bodyguard, laughing in the 1946 short: Solid Serenade)
 Mel Blanc (1946, 1953–1954, 1963–1967): Screaming in the 1946 short, The Milky Waif (reused from the 1942 MGM cartoon, The Hungry Wolf), sneezing in the shorts: Just Ducky and Puppy Tale (reused from The Hungry Wolf), vocal effects in the Chuck Jones era (1963–1967), and The Tom and Jerry Show (archival recording from The Hungry Wolf) 
 Cal Howard (1946): speaking in the 1946 short: Trap Happy
 Ira "Buck" Woods (1946): singing in the 1946 short: Solid Serenade
 Red Coffey (1950, 1952–1953, 1955): quacking in the shorts: Little Quacker, The Duck Doctor and That's My Mommy, drowning vocal effects in the 1953 short: Just Ducky
 Ken Darby (1950): "singing" in the 1950 short: Texas Tom
 Paul Frees (1951): snoring in Sleepy-Time Tom
 Pinto Colvig (1952): Seal vocal effects in the 1952 short: Little Runaway
 Fred Karbo (1953): laughing in the 1953 short: Life with Tom
 Daws Butler (1957): speaking in the 1957 short: Mucho Mouse
 Allen Swift (1961–1962): vocal effects in the Gene Deitch era (1961–1962) shorts
 Gene Deitch (1962): laughing in Buddies Thicker Than Water
 Terence Monk (1964, 1967): singing in The Cat Above and the Mouse Below, singing in Cat and Dupli-cat
 Arte Johnson: Mattel Tom and Jerry Talking Hand Puppet
 John Stephenson: The Tom and Jerry Show
 Don Messick: imitating the ghost's laugh and snickering in The Tom and Jerry Show (1975 TV series) episode "Castle Wiz"
 Lou Scheimer: The Tom and Jerry Comedy Show
 Frank W. Welker: vocal effects in Tom & Jerry Kids and The Tom and Jerry Show (2014 TV series) episode "Just Plane Nuts"
 Richard Kind (1992): speaking, non-speaking and singing in Tom and Jerry: The Movie
 Jeff Bergman: Cartoon Network Latin America bumper, Boomerang UK bumper
 Alan Marriott: Tom and Jerry in Fists of Furry
 Jeff Bennett: Tom and Jerry: The Magic Ring
 Marc Silk: Tom and Jerry in War of the Whiskers
 Bill Kopp: Tom and Jerry: Blast Off to Mars and Tom and Jerry: The Fast and the Furry
 Spike Brandt: The Karate Guard, Tom and Jerry: A Nutcracker Tale, Tom and Jerry Meet Sherlock Holmes, Tom and Jerry and the Wizard of Oz, Tom and Jerry: Robin Hood and His Merry Mouse, Tom and Jerry's Giant Adventure, Tom and Jerry: The Lost Dragon, Tom and Jerry: Spy Quest, Tom and Jerry: Back to Oz, and Tom and Jerry: Willy Wonka and the Chocolate Factory
 Don Brown: Tom and Jerry Tales
 Rich Danhakl: The Tom and Jerry Show (2014 TV series)
 Tom Kenny: Four of his 9 lives in The Tom and Jerry Show (2014 TV series)
 Dave B. Mitchell: Three of his 9 lives in The Tom and Jerry Show (2014 TV series)
 Rene Mujica: One of his 9 lives in The Tom and Jerry Show (2014 TV series)
 Kaiji Tang: Tom & Jerry
 T-Pain: singing in Tom & Jerry
 Andrew Dickman: Tom and Jerry Special Shorts
 Eric Bauza: MultiVersus

Voiced by in unofficial material:
 Stephen Stanton (2012): Mad
 Seth MacFarlane (2013): Family Guy

Tom has had a number of different voice actors over the years. When the character debuted in Puss Gets the Boot, voice actor Harry E. Lang provided the screeches and meows for Tom. He would continue to do so until Sufferin Cats (1943). Beginning with the short The Night Before Christmas (1941), co-creator William Hanna provided the vocal effects and famous screams for the character until the last Hanna-Barbera short Tot Watchers (1958). This was accomplished by someone recording him screaming, chopping the top and bottom of it, leaving the strongest part of the recording in. During this time period, Lang continued doing vocal effects for Tom and occasionally did his speaking voice between 1943 and 1946. Billy Bletcher also voiced him in a few shorts between 1944 and 1950. In 1961–1962, when Gene Deitch took over as director after the MGM cartoon studio shut down in 1957, he and Allen Swift did vocal effects for Tom throughout that time period. When Chuck Jones took over during 1963–1967, he, Abe Levitow and Mel Blanc (best known for voicing Bugs Bunny and other characters) voiced Tom. Terence Monk did his singing voice in  The Cat Above and the Mouse Below (1964) and Cat and Dupli-cat (1967).

In The Tom and Jerry Show (1975), Tom was voiced by John Stephenson. Lou Scheimer voiced him in The Tom and Jerry Comedy Show in 1980–1982. Frank Welker voiced him in Tom and Jerry Kids in 1990–1993. Other voice actors include Richard Kind (in Tom and Jerry: The Movie), Jeff Bergman (in a Cartoon Network Latin America bumper and a Boomerang UK bumper), Alan Marriott (in Tom and Jerry in Fists of Furry), Jeff Bennett (in Tom and Jerry: The Magic Ring), Marc Silk (in Tom and Jerry in War of the Whiskers), Bill Kopp (in Tom and Jerry: Blast Off to Mars and Tom and Jerry: The Fast and the Furry), Spike Brandt (in The Karate Guard, Tom and Jerry: A Nutcracker Tale, Tom and Jerry Meet Sherlock Holmes, Tom and Jerry and the Wizard of Oz, Tom and Jerry: Robin Hood and His Merry Mouse, Tom and Jerry's Giant Adventure, Tom and Jerry: The Lost Dragon, Tom and Jerry: Spy Quest, Tom and Jerry: Back to Oz, and Tom and Jerry: Willy Wonka and the Chocolate Factory), and Don Brown (in Tom and Jerry Tales). In The Tom and Jerry Show (2014 TV series), his vocal effects are provided by the show's sound designer Rich Danhakl and archival recordings of William Hanna from the original theatrical shorts. In Tom & Jerry (2021 film), his voice was provided by Kaiji Tang and archived recordings of William Hanna.

On 18 November 2021, it was confirmed that Eric Bauza would be voicing the character in the 2022 fighting game, MultiVersus, which establishes Tom's original given name "Jasper" to be his middle name. Additionally, William Hanna's archival audio recordings (usually Tom's iconic screams as a death scream sound) are also used in the game.

In popular culture
Tom's screams have been used as stock sound effects in various media, such as the 1981 James Bond film For Your Eyes Only, Critters 2 and Critters 3 (used for the Critters when they scream and shriek) and the Hi Hi Puffy AmiYumi episode, "Small Stuff" (used for Jang Keng, a black cat). It was also used for the caveman in the 1995 game Prehistorik Man.

Tom and Jerry were planned to appear as a cameo in the deleted scene "Acme's Funeral" from the 1988 film Who Framed Roger Rabbit.

The Itchy & Scratchy Show from The Simpsons parodies Tom and Jerry, with its cat character Scratchy, unlike Tom, usually being portrayed as a harmless character who is subject to wanton unprovoked violence by the psychopathic Itchy.

Tom is also the only cartoon character whose name is used for a type of military vehicle, which is the "TomCat" jet fighter.

See also
 Tom and Jerry
 List of Hanna-Barbera characters
 Metro-Goldwyn-Mayer cartoon studio

References

Tom and Jerry characters
Animal characters in films
Animal characters in television
Anthropomorphic cats
Film characters introduced in 1940
MGM cartoon characters
Male characters in animation
Male characters in television
Fictional mute characters
Fictional cats
Film and television memes
Fighting game characters